The albums discography of English singer Cliff Richard consists of  48 studio albums (46 English and 2 German), seven soundtrack albums, 11 live albums, three cast recording albums, 17 mainstream compilation albums, one remix album, 12 box sets, eight gospel compilation albums and 47 EPs. It also includes numerous budget/mid-price compilation albums, repackaged albums, and foreign compilation albums (i.e. albums that were not released in the UK).

It is claimed Cliff Richard's worldwide sales are 260 million, which makes him the second highest selling British male solo artist worldwide of all time, after Elton John. Richard, together with his backing band The Shadows, were particularly dominant in the UK from 1958 to 1963 during the pre-Beatles era.

Richard's debut album was Cliff, released in April 1959, and was recorded live at Abbey Road Studios before a small invited audience. The album spent over 30 non-consecutive weeks in the UK Albums Chart (which was then a top ten) and was followed up with his first studio album Cliff Sings in November 1959. Richard's success continued, achieving his first number-one album two years later with 21 Today, until 1965 when his foreign-language album When in Rome failed to make the charts. Towards the end of the 1960s and the first half of the 1970s, Richard's popularity in terms of albums waned and it was not until his 1976 album I'm Nearly Famous that Richard changed the focus of his recording career from singles to albums, leading to his first top-ten album of the 1970s. This led Richard to have a resurgence in popularity through the rest of the 1970s and 1980s in a period that saw his albums I'm Nearly Famous, Rock 'n' Roll Juvenile and I'm No Hero break the top 100 of the Billboard 200. Since 1987, Richard has reached the top 20 with all his studio albums and achieved his most recent number one with The Album in 1993.

In 2018, it was Cliff's 60th year in the music industry and he released his first studio album of new recordings in 14 years, titled Rise Up, which was recorded after a battle with the BBC. In 2020, Richard released his 105th album, Music... The Air That I Breathe. The album entered the UK Albums Chart at number three, which saw Richard become the first artist to make the top five of the albums chart for eight consecutive decades. Richard's latest album, Christmas with Cliff, was released in November 2022 and is his third album consisting of Christmas music. Richard has achieved seven number-one albums on the UK Albums Chart in the 1960s, 1970s, 1980s and 1990s and has amassed 30 top-five albums and 47 top-ten albums.

Alongside, his main 46 studio albums, Richard has also recorded two albums solely recorded in German which were only released in Germany (and German-speaking countries). Richard has also released innumerable compilation albums. In the discography below, the more significant of these have been split into sections. Under the 'Main compilation albums' section are the compilation albums that were released in the UK and charted. The second, 'Budget compilation albums', are the albums released on dedicated budget album labels or released at prices less than full price product (such as mid-price releases). Also included in this section are notable albums released by specialist re-issue record labels, which usually contain previously unreleased material or material previously unreleased on CD. The third section, 'Gospel compilation albums', consists of albums dedicated to gospel tracks only, or released by Christian music labels for the Contemporary Christian music market. The final section, 'Foreign compilation albums' consists of albums that were not released in the UK, but were released elsewhere and charted. The discography below also lists repackaged albums which are previously released albums, typically retitled, given a new cover and released with the same or predominantly the same track listing.

Studio albums

Live albums

Soundtrack albums

Cast recording albums

Remix albums

Compilation albums

Main compilation albums

Budget compilation albums

Gospel compilation albums

Foreign compilation albums

Box sets

Repackaged albums

German studio albums

EPs

See also
 Cliff Richard singles discography
 Cliff Richard videography

Notes

References

External links
Cliff Richard Albums page 

Discographies of British artists
Rock music discographies
Pop music discographies
Albums discography